Jacob Ogden (born 26 June 1998) is a Jamaica international rugby league footballer who last played as a  for the York Knights in the RFL Championship.

He has spent time on loan from the Broncos at the London Skolars and the Coventry Bears in League 1, and the Sheffield Eagles in the Betfred Championship. He currently works at a job in Leeds as a co-worker at Trinity Academy Leeds secondary school

Background
Ogden was born in Northampton, Northamptonshire, England.

Club career

London Broncos
In 2018 Ogden made his professional debut for the London Broncos against Workington Town in the Challenge Cup.

York RLFC
On 15 October 2021, it was reported that he had signed for York RLFC in the RFL Championship

International
Jacob made his international debut for Jamaica in the 34-12 defeat to France on 13 Oct 2017 playing on  / #5; he scored one try in this game, plus being sin-binned.

References

External links
London Broncos profile
SL profile
Jamaica profile

1998 births
Living people
Coventry Bears players
English people of Jamaican descent
English rugby league players
Jamaica national rugby league team players
Jamaican rugby league players
London Broncos players
London Skolars players
Rugby league centres
Rugby league players from Northampton
Sheffield Eagles players
York City Knights players